"6 Foot 7 Foot" (also styled as "6'7") is a song by rapper Lil Wayne featuring label mate Cory Gunz. It is taken from Wayne's ninth album, Tha Carter IV (2011). It was officially  released on iTunes on December 16, 2010. It was produced by "A Milli" producer Bangladesh. The song samples "Day-O (The Banana Boat Song)" by Harry Belafonte (particularly, as the title implies, the lyric "6 foot, 7 foot, 8 foot bunch".)

Background
"6 Foot 7 Foot" is the first single off Tha Carter IV. The track is the first single Lil Wayne recorded following his release from prison on November 4, 2010, though it is the second song on which he has appeared since his prison release, after the final version of Birdman's single "Fire Flame", on which he had 2 verses. In the original version of the single, Lil Wayne is absent due to his prison sentence. Before the song was officially released, Shade 45's DJ Drama interviewed Lil Wayne and he talked about the single. He said "It's a monster," and "Hopefully, it shows people where I'm at lyrically." Mack Maine, president of Young Money and fellow labelmate, called it "A Milli on steroids." The track was originally intended for rapper T.I., but the Atlantic records manager who also co-manages Lil Wayne, decided Lil Wayne would be a better fit, reuniting Lil Wayne and producer Bangladesh for the first time since "A Milli" after the royalty dispute between Bangladesh and Cash Money on that song.
It is the second time the trio (Lil Wayne, Cory Gunz, Bangladesh) have worked together, after 2008's "A Milli" (though Cory Gunz was not on the final version of that song). Lil Wayne performed the song on Saturday Night Live and New Year's Eve with Carson Daly. He also performed it on 106 & Party Cash Money Young Money New Years.

Music video
On January 20, 2011, Lil Wayne announced that there would be a music video for the single in the upcoming spring.  A picture was uploaded by Rap-Up of Lil Wayne portraying a boxer. Birdman as well as the Young Money crew (excluding Drake, Nicki Minaj, Tyga, Gudda Gudda and Mack Maine) make cameo appearances in the video. The video made premieres on MTV on March 3, 2011, and on BET's 106 & Park on March 4, 2011. The video (directed by Hype Williams) was inspired by the film Inception, with Lil Wayne and the Young Money crew portraying several scenarios from the film and consists of numerous scenes which visualize many of the metaphors and similes Wayne says in the song. The explicit version of the video has received 152 million views as of July 2020 on YouTube, while the clean version of the video has received above 3 million views.

Credits and personnel
Recording
Recorded at CMR South Studios, Miami, FL by Michael Cadahia. Assisted by Edward Lidow.

Personnel
Mixing  Fabian Marasciullo
Assistant mixing  Seth Waldman
Mixed at  Conway Studios, Los Angeles
Mastering  Dave Kutch (single version); Brian "Big Bass" Gardner (album version)

Charts and certifications

Commercial performance
"6 Foot 7 Foot" debuted at number 9 in the Billboard Hot 100 chart (week of January 1, 2011) and number 3 on the Digital Songs chart. By January 2013, the song has sold over 3 million digital downloads in the U.S.

Weekly charts

Year-end charts

Certifications

Covers
On May 10, 2017 Insane Clown Posse released a cover of the song as well as a music video featuring Psychopathic Records artist Lyte.

References

2010 singles
Lil Wayne songs
Cash Money Records singles
Young Money Entertainment singles
Universal Motown Records singles
Song recordings produced by Bangladesh (record producer)
Songs written by Lil Wayne
Music videos directed by Hype Williams
2010 songs
Songs written by Bangladesh (record producer)
Bananas in popular culture